Kato Samiko (meaning "lower Samiko") is a village and a community in the municipal unit of Skillounta, Elis, Greece. It is situated 2 km from the Ionian Sea, 3 km southeast of Samiko, 6 km southwest of Krestena, 8 km northwest of Zacharo and 20 km southeast of Pyrgos. Its population in 2011 was 428 for the village and 494 for the community, which includes the small villages Kleidi and Fragkokklisia. The Greek National Road 9 (E55, Patras - Pyrgos - Kyparissia) and the railway from Pyrgos to Kalamata run through the village. Kato Samiko suffered damage from the 2007 Greek forest fires. The ruins of ancient Samicum lie within the borders of the municipal unit.

Population

See also
List of settlements in Elis

External links
Kato Samiko at the GTP Travel Pages

References

Skillounta
Populated places in Elis